Tiger Joe is a 1982 Italian adventure film  written and directed by Antonio Margheriti and starring David Warbeck, Annie Belle and Tony King.

Plot
Tiger Joe is a former US Army Special Forces Vietnam Veteran now gunrunning to anti-Khmer Rouge freedom fighters.  When his plane is shot down, Tiger Joe joins a female rebel in her fight.

Cast 
 David Warbeck as Joe "Tiger Joe"
 Annie Belle as Kia
 Tony King as  "Midnight" Washington
 Alan Collins as Lenny
 Giancarlo Badessi as Bronski

Production
Cinematographer Riccardo Pallottini died in a helicopter crash during production.

See also
 List of Italian films of 1982

References

External links
  
Tiger Joe at Variety Distribution  

1980s adventure films
Films directed by Antonio Margheriti
Films scored by Carlo Savina
Italian adventure films
Cold War films
Macaroni Combat films
Films shot in the Philippines
Films set in Cambodia
1980s Italian films